Thomasina or Thomasine is the feminine form of the given name Thomas, which means "twin". Thomasina is often shortened to Tamsin. Tamsin can be used as a name in itself; variants of Tamsin include Tamsyn, Tamzin, Tamsen, Tammi and Tamasin. The version "Tamsin" is especially popular in Cornwall and Wales. Along with Tamara it is the ancestor of "Tammy".

People named Thomasina (and variants)

Tammi
 Tammi Patterson (born 1990), Australian tennis player
 Tammi Terrell (1945–1970), American recording artist

Tammie
 Tammie Jo Shults (born 1961), American commercial airline captain, author, and retired naval aviator

Tammy

Tamsen
 Tamsen Donner (1801–1847), third wife of George Donner of the Donner Party
 Tamsen Fadal, American journalist, news anchor, author and host/executive producer
 Tamsen McGarry (born 1982), Irish alpine skier
 Emil Tamsen (1862–1957), South African philatelist
.  Tamsin Darlington 
 Tamsin Blanchard, British fashion journalist
 Tamsin Carroll (born 1979), Australian actress
 Tamsin Cook (born 1998), Australian swimmer
 Tamsin Dunwoody (born 1958), sometimes known as Tamsin Dunwoody-Kneafsey, British politician
 Tamsin Edwards, British climate scientist
 Tamsin Egerton (born 1988), British actress
 Tamsin Ford (born 1966), British psychiatrist specialising in children's mental health
 Tamsin Greenway (born 1982), English netball player
 Tamsin Greig (born 1966), British actress
 Tamsin Heatley, British actress and voice artist
 Tamsin Hinchley (born 1980), Australian volleyball player
 Tamsin Mather (born 1976), British Professor of Earth Sciences 
 Tamsin Pickeral (born 1971), British author and art historian
 Tamsin West (born 1974), Australian actress and singer

Tamsyn
 Tamsyn Challenger, Cornish artist
 Dame Tamsyn Imison (1937–2017), British educator 
 Tamsyn Leevey (born 1978)  New Zealand squash player
 Tamsyn Manou (born 1978), Australian athlete and middle-distance runner
 Tamsyn Muir, New Zealand author of fantasy, science fiction and horror genres
 Oona Tamsyn King, Baroness King of Bow (born 1967), British Labour politician

Tamzin
 Tamzin Malleson (born 1974), British actress
 Tamzin Merchant (born 1987), British actress
 Tamzin Outhwaite (born 1970), British actress
 Tamzin Thomas (born 1997), South African sprinter

Thomasin
 Thomasin von Zirclaere or Tommasino Di Cerclaria (c.1186–c.1235), Italian Middle High German lyric poet.
 Thomasin McKenzie (born 2000), New Zealand actress

Thomasina
 Thomasina Jordan (?–1999), American Indian activist who became the first American Indian to serve in the United States Electoral College
 Thomasina Miers (born 1976), British chef
 Thomasina Pidgeon (born 1975), Canadian rock climber
 Thomasina Winslow (1965-2023}, American blues musician

Thomasine
 Thomasine Christine Gyllembourg-Ehrensvärd (1773–1856), Danish author
 Thomasine, Lady Percival (–), Cornish benefactress
 Thomas(ine) Hall (–after 1629), an intersex individual in British America
 Margrethe Marie Thomasine Numsen (1705–1776), Danish courtier

Fictional Thomasinas
 Beatrix Potter's Thomasina Tittlemouse.
 Tamsin Yeobright from The Return of the Native by Thomas Hardy. Her name is given alternately as Tamsin or Thomasin throughout the book.
 Thomasina, the feline heroine of the 1957 book Thomasina: The Cat Who Thought She Was God by Paul Gallico and The Three Lives of Thomasina, a 1964 Disney film based on the book.
 Thomasina, a character in Tom Stoppard's Arcadia.
 Thomasina, a character in the television series Kings.
 "Thomasina", a song by The Besnard Lakes.
 Tamsin, a character in the television series Lost Girl.
 Thomasin, a character in Robert Eggers' 2015 film The Witch.
 Tamasin Reedbourne, a character in C. J. Sansom's Shardlake book series.

Similar names
Thomas
Tammy
Tamara
Tamar
Tasmin
Tazmin

References

English feminine given names